Zodarion guadianense is a spider species found in Portugal.

See also 
 List of Zodariidae species

References

External links 

guadianense
Fauna of Portugal
Spiders of Europe
Spiders described in 2003